Cerdaia is a genus of beetles in the family Cerambycidae, containing the following species:

 Cerdaia lunata (Germain, 1898)
 Cerdaia testacea (Cerda, 1980)

References

Achrysonini